Desert Shores (formerly Fish Springs) is a census-designated place (CDP) in Imperial County, California, US.  It is part of the El Centro Metropolitan Statistical Area.

Geography and climate

The town is located at the western shore of the Salton Sea in the Imperial Valley, within the Colorado Desert ecoregion.

The surficial geology is dominated by Quaternary-era alluvial sands and clays.

According to the Köppen Climate Classification system, Desert Shores has a subtropical hot-desert climate ("BWh"). The coldest month is January with an average daytime high temperature of 63 °F (17 °C) and an average nighttime low of 35 °F (2 °C), while July is the hottest month, with an average daytime high temperature of 105 °F (41 °C) and an average nighttime low of 72 °F (22 °C). The all-time record high temperature is 126 °F (52 °C), and the all-time record low temperature is 13 °F (−11 °C). Sunshine is abundant all year due to a large amount of descending high pressure, and rainfall averages about 3 inches (76 millimeters) annually.

Demographics

The population was 1,128 at the 2020 census, up from 1,104 in 2010, up from 792 in 2000.

2010
The 2010 United States Census reported that Desert Shores had a population of 1,104. The racial makeup of Desert Shores was 709 (64.2%) White, 8 (0.7%) African American, 26 (2.4%) Native American, 4 (0.4%) Asian, 1 (0.1%) Pacific Islander, 307 (27.8%) from other races, and 49 (4.4%) from two or more races. Hispanic or Latino of any race were 848 persons (76.8%).

The Census reported that 1,104 people (100% of the population) lived in households, 0 (0%) lived in non-institutionalized group quarters, and 0 (0%) were institutionalized.

There were 344 households, out of which 167 (48.5%) had children under the age of 18 living in them, 181 (52.6%) were opposite-sex married couples living together, 37 (10.8%) had a female householder with no husband present, 27 (7.8%) had a male householder with no wife present.  There were 29 (8.4%) unmarried opposite-sex partnerships, and 1 (0.3%) same-sex married couples or partnerships. 80 households (23.3%) were made up of individuals, and 42 (12.2%) had someone living alone who was 65 years of age or older. The average household size was 3.21.  There were 245 families (71.2% of all households); the average family size was 3.84.

The population was spread out, with 352 people (31.9%) under the age of 18, 124 people (11.2%) aged 18 to 24, 263 people (23.8%) aged 25 to 44, 218 people (19.7%) aged 45 to 64, and 147 people (13.3%) who were 65 years of age or older.  The median age was 29.9 years. For every 100 females, there were 108.7 males.  For every 100 females age 18 and over, there were 98.4 males.

The homeowner vacancy rate was 4.2%; the rental vacancy rate was 2.4%.  704 people (63.8% of the population) lived in owner-occupied housing units and 400 people (36.2%) lived in rental housing units.

2000
As of the census of 2000, there were 792 people, 279 households, and 181 families residing in the CDP. The racial makeup of the CDP was 73.5% White, 1.4% Black or African American, 0.9% Native American, 0.3% Asian, 21.1% from other races, and 2.9% from two or more races.  60.9% of the population were Hispanic or Latino of any race.

There were 279 households, out of which 28.3% had children under the age of 18 living with them, 50.5% were married couples living together, 5.4% had a female householder with no husband present, and 35.1% were non-families. 29.0% of all households were made up of individuals, and 18.3% had someone living alone who was 65 years of age or older.  The average household size was 2.8 and the average family size was 3.6.

In the CDP, the population was spread out, with 26.9% under the age of 18, 8.5% from 18 to 24, 25.4% from 25 to 44, 18.8% from 45 to 64, and 20.5% who were 65 years of age or older.  The median age was 37 years. For every 100 females, there were 128.2 males.  For every 100 females age 18 and over, there were 125.3 males.

The median income for a household in the CDP was $24,712, and the median income for a family was $29,550. Males had a median income of $26,176 versus $19,375 for females. The per capita income for the CDP was $8,352.  About 12.0% of families and 7.9% of the population were below the poverty line, including none of those under age 18 and 14.9% of those age 65 or over.

Government

Local
Desert Shores and its neighboring community of Salton City are governed by the Salton Community Services District (SCSD), which is a special district per California Government Code. The legislative body of the SCSD is a five-member Board of Directors who are elected by the registered voters in the district every two years.

The SCSD has seven services that it is authorized to provide:
Collect, treat, or dispose of sewage.
Collect, transfer, and dispose of solid waste.
Provide fire protection.
Acquire, construct recreational facilities.
Organize, promote community recreation.
Acquire, construct, and improve street lighting and landscaping.
Provide emergency medical services.

Aside from acting as the architectural committee for architectural compliance with the Covenants, Conditions, and Restrictions (CC&R) of the 80 plus tracts within the district, the SCSD has no land use authority under existing law; that responsibility falls on the Imperial County Board of Supervisors.

Water service is provided by the Coachella Valley Water District.

State and federal

In popular culture

A town based on Desert Shores called Sandy Shores is featured in the video game Grand Theft Auto V; next to a lake based on the Salton Sea called the Alamo Sea.

The 2019 film Desert Shores was filmed in Desert Shores and around the Salton Sea. The movie is based on George McCormick's short story collection Salton Sea.

The 2020 documentary The Miracle in the Desert details a community-led effort to refill the Desert Shores canals from the Salton Sea.

See also
 El Centro Metropolitan Area
 San Diego–Imperial, California

References

External links
Salton Sea West.com: homepage — a non-commercial website with a large library of government documents pertaining to Desert Shores.

Census-designated places in Imperial County, California
Salton Sea
El Centro metropolitan area
Populated places in the Colorado Desert
Census-designated places in California